Cerea is a town in the region of Veneto in Italy.

Cerea, waxy in Latin, may refer to:
 Cerea (Crete), a town of ancient Crete
 Cerea, a fictional planet in the Star Wars franchise

See also 
 Cereus (disambiguation)